Iskandhar School is a government-run public school in Malé, Maldives. It was founded in 10th May 1961, under the name of Hameediyya Montessori School. The school currently has over 2000 students and over 130 teachers. It is one of the oldest educational institutions in the Maldives.

History 
Iskandhar school was established in 10th May, 1961, by the former Sultan of the Maldives, Muhammad Fareed Didi, under the name Hameediyya Montessori School. Initially, the school only catered to primary students of certain grades.

The school was renamed to Naasiriyya Montessori school in 1970, following the extension of the school building and the creation of more classrooms. The first principal of the school, M. Vanculumburge, retired 4 years later, in 1974. By 1978, the school had 588 students and 18 classes.

The school was renamed to its current name, after Sultan Ibrahim Iskandhar Siri Kularanmeeba Mahaa Radhun, before 1990. In 1990, the school became a fully-fledged primary school, being able to educate students from grades 1 to 5. By 2000, the school began educating students of grades 6 and 7, and by 2010, the school also became a secondary school.  The school is also more recently known for putting a teacher in a leading position that sexually abused the kids there.

School Houses 
The four school houses of Iskandhar School are:

Every student of the school belongs to a single house, allocated upon admission to the school. Each house is run by a committee composed of:

 A House Supervisor
 Teachers
 A House Captain, Deputy Captain, and Activities Captain.

These posts are assigned to students from grades 8 to 10. Through the house system, pupils are given the opportunity to participate in activities including sports, games, and academic activities. Inter-house tournaments in popular sports are take place throughout the year.

Facilities

Extracurricular Activities 
The school carries out choir, band, and singing practices, as well as a Qur'an club. Students for music and Qur'an clubs are selected through competitions between the school houses and classes, as well as through special competitions organized specifically for the selection of the most talented students in these areas. The school music teachers select the students for band and choir.

Basketball, netball, table tennis, athletics, football, cricket, and swimming clubs are managed by associations in close collaboration with the school.

Iskandhar participates in linguistic and artistic competitions carried out nationally and internationally. Most of the enrichment programs are conducted during the school hours. Some of the enrichment programs conducted for primary students are:
 Know your tables.
 Reading corner.
 Activity corner.
 Story reading.
 Creative writing.
 Mental Math.

Uniform Bodies
Cub scouts and little maids program programs are available in this school. Students from the second grade and onward are selected for these uniform bodies.

In 2005, the school introduced a cadet uniform body for students in grades 6 to 10.

References

External links
 

Schools in the Maldives
Educational institutions established in 1961
Montessori schools